Banswara Lok Sabha constituency is one of the 25 Lok Sabha (parliamentary) constituencies in Rajasthan state in western India.

Assembly segments
Presently, Banswara Lok Sabha constituency comprises eight Vidhan Sabha (legislative assembly) segments. These are:

Members of Parliament

Election results

See also
 Banswara district
 List of Constituencies of the Lok Sabha

Notes

Banswara district
Lok Sabha constituencies in Rajasthan